Patrice Carpentier is a French professional sailor born on 10 January 1950 in Falaise, Calvados.

He holds a BA in letters. Married with four children, he lives in La Trinidad-sur-Mer.

He writes for Race Au Large and SeaHorse Magazine. He became race director for the 2018 Golden Globe race.

Career highlights

References

1950 births
Living people
French male sailors (sport)
Volvo Ocean Race sailors
Class 40 class sailors
IMOCA 60 class sailors
French Vendee Globe sailors
1989 Vendee Globe sailors
2000 Vendee Globe sailors
2004 Vendee Globe sailors
Vendée Globe finishers
Single-handed circumnavigating sailors